Chaudhro, aka Goth Chaudhrio, is a village and deh in Bulri Shah Karim taluka of Tando Muhammad Khan District, Sindh. As of 2017, it has a population of 5,111, in 985 households. It is the seat of a tapedar circle, which also includes the villages of Bilal, Doulatpur, Narki, and Sitar.

References 

Populated places in Tando Muhammad Khan District